The upside-down pipefish (Heraldia nocturna) is a species of pipefish endemic to the coast of southern Australia, from New South Wales to Geographe Bay in Western Australia, where it is found in rocky reefs at depths of from . It grows to a length of  SL. This species is the only known member of its genus. Like other pipefish it is ovoviviparous but it may breed seasonally, as gravid males have been collected between September and November.

Etymology 
This genus was named in honor of Earl Stannard Herald, an American expert on syngnathids who died as a result of a diving accident off of Cabo San Lucas, Mexico. The common name, "upside-down pipefish", comes from its habit of swimming upside down in caves before emerging at night to feed, and this nocturnal habit gives rise to its specific name, nocturna.

References

External links
 Fishes of Australia: Heraldia nocturna

Syngnathidae
Marine fish of Southern Australia
Taxa named by John Richard Paxton
Fish described in 1975